Hedwig Pringsheim (born Gertrud Hedwig Anna Dohm; 13 July 1855 – 27 July 1942) was a German actress.

Born in Berlin, she was the daughter of Ernst Dohm and Hedwig Dohm-Schleh, who were Jewish converts to Christianity. She married Alfred Pringsheim. They had 5 children: Erich Pringsheim, Peter Pringsheim, Heinz Pringsheim, Klaus Pringsheim Sr. and Katia Pringsheim who married Thomas Mann.

Pringsheim died in Zurich at the age of 87.

Works 
 Die Manns – Ein Jahrhundertroman

See also 
 Dohm–Mann family tree

External links 
 Die Manns und kein Ende: Katias Mutter - Kultur - Printarchiv - Berliner Morgenpost at www.morgenpost.de
 Familie Mann revisited - Walter und Inge Jens legen die Biografie Hedwig Pringsheims vor : literaturkritik.de at www.literaturkritik.de
 

1855 births
1942 deaths
Actresses from Berlin
German stage actresses
Jewish German actresses
Jewish emigrants from Nazi Germany to Switzerland
20th-century German women